St. Paul's Episcopal Church is located in Greenville, Texas, approximately 50 miles north east of Dallas.

The church was designated a mission church in 1877, and the sanctuary located at 3215 Stonewall Street was opened on July 16, 1896.  In 1966 the site received the Texas Historic Landmark which noted that it was the oldest church building still in use in Greenville.  Six years later a fire destroyed the historic structure and the building was razed.  Land was purchased at 8320 Jack Finney Blvd. (FM 1570), and a new sanctuary was constructed during the following year.  The parish hall and other facilities were added over the years as well.  The historical marker for the original building is located in the parish hall.  In 1984, the St. Paul's Episcopal School constructed its current facility on church land.

See also 

Anglican Communion
Episcopal Church in the United States of America
Episcopal Diocese of Dallas

External links
Official website
St. Paul's Episcopal School
Episcopal Church of the USA
Anglican Communion
Episcopal Diocese of Dallas

Churches in Hunt County, Texas
Episcopal churches in Texas